Liao Pen-yen (born 26 September 1956) is a Taiwanese politician who  served two terms in the Legislative Yuan from 2002 to 2008.

Education
Liao graduated from Fu Jen Catholic University with a degree in business management.

Political career
Liao was elected the mayor of Shulin in 1993, serving in that position until 2002. During his tenure, Liao and other township heads were investigated for corruption, as they had charged multiple businesses a "township chief tax" to raise money for local community development funds. He ran in the legislative elections of 2001 and won a seat in the Legislative Yuan. Liao was the Taiwan Solidarity Union's caucus whip throughout most of his time in office. His expulsion from the TSU, announced in October 2007 and confirmed in November, for refusing to support the party's policies, led four other party members to defect. Shortly after Liao's expulsion the TSU ran ads in the United Daily News suggesting that Liao should join the Democratic Progressive Party. Later that month, Liao and a couple other defectors launched reelection bids under the DPP banner. A group of women's rights organizations opposed Liao's candidacy, and his 2008 campaign was unsuccessful. Though he was reported to be leading the race six days before polls opened, Liao lost to Huang Chih-hsiung by 5.49% of votes. Liao stood for election again in 2012, but did not win. He was elected to the New Taipei City Council in 2014.

Controversy
In 2010, the Taipei District Court found Liao not guilty of taking bribes from the Taiwan Dental Association. In September 2011, the Taiwan High Court heard an appeal of the case and sentenced him to seven years and three months imprisonment, as well as a suspension of civil rights for three years. The High Court ruling was appealed to the Supreme Court, which cleared him of the charges in March 2016.

Personal life
Liao Pen-yen's son Liao Yi-kun ran for a legislative seat in 2016, but was defeated in a Democratic Progressive Party primary by Su Chiao-hui.

References

1956 births
Living people
New Taipei Members of the Legislative Yuan
Members of the 5th Legislative Yuan
Members of the 6th Legislative Yuan
Taiwan Solidarity Union Members of the Legislative Yuan
Fu Jen Catholic University alumni
Taiwanese politicians of Hakka descent
Mayors of places in Taiwan
New Taipei City Councilors
Democratic Progressive Party Members of the Legislative Yuan